文正 may refer to:
Bunshō, Japanese era name corresponding to February 1466 through March 1467

As a given name:
Mochtar Riady (李文正, born 1929), Indonesian businessman who founded the Lippo Group
Wayne Pai (白文正, 1952–2008), Taiwanese businessman who founded the Polaris Group
Liu Wen-cheng (劉文正, born 1952), Taiwanese singer and movie actor
Eric Chang (Belizean politician) (張文正, born 1979), Belizean politician from Taiwan
Man-Ching Donald Yu (余文正, born 1980), Hong Kong composer

As a posthumous name:
Sima Guang (1019–1086), Song Dynasty historian
Yelü Chucai (1190–1244), Liao Dynasty Khitan statesman
Jo Gwang-jo (1482–1509), Joseon Dynasty Korean neo-Confucian scholar
Song Jun-gil (1606–1672), Joseon Dynasty Korean scholar and official
Song Siyeol (1607–1689), Joseon Dynasty Korean scholar and official
Zeng Guofan (1811–1872), Qing Dynasty Chinese official and general